Cheltonia is an extinct genus of ammonite from the Upper Sinemurian substage of Lower Jurassic of Europe, Africa, and America. It is probably a microconch of genus Oxynoticeras.

Description 
Ammonites belonging to this genus had small platyconic shell, on which the last whorl has been eccentrically coiled. Ventral rostrum could be preceded by 3 to 5 crawlings. Umbilicus took about 30—40% of diameter. Ribs were falcoid and weak. Suture has been the same as in the case of young Oxynoticeras.

References 

Oxynoticeratidae
Ammonitida genera
Ammonites of Africa
Ammonites of Europe
Early Jurassic ammonites of Europe
Jurassic animals of Africa
Sinemurian life